The flag of Turkmeneli, a region of Iraq where the Iraqi Turkmens have historically been dominant, is the same flag used to represent the Iraqi Turkmen. It consists of a cyan background symbolizing the sky, with two horizontal white stripes running the width of the flag surrounding the white star and crescent which is positioned in the center of the flag.

References

Iraqi Turkmens
Flags of Iraq